Llandow (Wick Road) Halt railway station was a short-lived railway station in South Wales.

History and Description
The halt was opened to serve RAF Llandow after the development of RAF bases in the area caused the traffic on the Vale of Glamorgan Line to increase. The halt had two full-length platforms, each with a rudimentary brick shelter. Although the base closed in 1957, the halt remained open until passenger services were withdrawn in 1964.

Notes

References
Chapman, Colin (1998) The Vale of Glamorgan Railway The Oakwoood Press

Disused railway stations in the Vale of Glamorgan
Railway stations in Great Britain opened in 1943
Railway stations in Great Britain closed in 1964
Former Great Western Railway stations
Beeching closures in Wales